The 2019 Codasur South American Rally Championship is an international rally championship sanctioned by the FIA and run by the Confederacion Deportiva Automovilismo Sudamericana (Codasur). The championship was contested over five events held in five South American countries from March to November.

Paraguayan Toyota driver Alejandro Galanti won the championship for the first time. Galanti won by a single point in a dramatic finish to the championship. Galanti won the season ending Rally del Atlántico ahead of second placed Hyundai driver Diego Domínguez who had been leading the championship going into the final rally. Domínguez won the first two events, the Rally de la Tierra Colorada and the Rally Trans Itapúa, and was second at the Rally de Erechim. Defending champion, Škoda driver Gustavo Saba, who had also still been in contention to win the championship, was third in the final event and the championship. Saba had won the Rally de Erechim. The Rally Santa Cruz de la Sierra was won by Bolivian Škoda driver Marco Bulacia Wilkinson.

Galanti was the first new Codasur champion since Domínguez won his first championship in 2014.

Event calendar and results

The 2019 Codasur South American Rally Championship was as follows:

Championship standings
The 2019 Codasur South American Rally Championship points were as follows:

Points were awarded to the top ten finishers of each rally and for the top eight positions of each leg of each rally.

References

External links

Codasur South American Rally Championship
Codasur South America
Codasur South American Rally Championship